The 1960 Texas Longhorns football team represented the University of Texas at Austin during the 1960 NCAA University Division football season.

Schedule

References

Texas
Texas Longhorns football seasons
Texas Longhorns football